Chinchippus is a genus of ammotrechid camel spiders, first described by Ralph Vary Chamberlin in 1920.

Species 
, the World Solifugae Catalog accepts the following two species:

 Chinchippus peruvianus Chamberlin, 1920 — Peru
 Chinchippus viejaensis Catenazzi, Brookhart & Cushing, 2009 — Peru

References 

Arachnid genera
Solifugae